The Bride and the Lover is a 2013 Filipino romantic film directed by Joel Lamangan, starring Lovi Poe, Jennylyn Mercado and Paulo Avelino.

Synopsis
In the story, Vivian (Lovi Poe) is sole heir to a business empire. Sheila is Vivian's friend who is a lifestyle magazine editor. Meanwhile, Philip is the hottest bachelor in town engaged to be wed to Vivian. However, a scandalous revelation tears the three characters' worlds apart. Time passes by and the supposed bride becomes the lover and the supposed lover is now the bride. What's more, the former bride becomes a fearfully revengeful lover who is relentless in her quest to get her ex-fiancé back.

Cast
 Lovi Poe as Vivian Paredes
 Jennylyn Mercado as Shiela Montes
 Paulo Avelino as Philip Albino
 Alex Castro as Matteo
 Hayden Kho as Bruno
 Tim Yap as Ricardo
 Joem Bascon as Mike
 Kat Alano as Gia
 Cai Cortez as Pinky
 Carlo Gonzales as Greg
 Alora Sasam as Poch
 Ariel Ureta as Nestor Paredes
 Timmy Cruz as Baby Montes
 Carmi Martin as Josephine Paredes
 Buboy Garovillo as Alfonso Albino
 Snooky Serna as Gloria Albino

External links

References 

2013 films
2010s Tagalog-language films
Philippine romance films
Regal Entertainment films
2013 romance films
Films directed by Joel Lamangan
2010s English-language films
2013 multilingual films
Philippine multilingual films